Earth is the second album by alternative rock musician Matthew Sweet.  It was released on A&M Records in 1989.

Details
In 1988, Sweet co-wrote (with Jules Shear) the title track to the final 'Til Tuesday album, Everything's Different Now and, the following year, Shear collaborated with Sweet on Earth.

In 1996, Sweet provided backing vocals for Kris McKay in a cover of his own song, "How Cool", on her album, Things That Show.

Track listing
All songs written by Matthew Sweet, except where noted
 "Easy"
 "When I Feel Again"
 "Wind and the Sun"
 "Children of Time (Forever)"
 "Love" (Sweet, Fred Maher)
 "Vertigo" (Sweet, Fred Maher)
 "Underground"
 "The Alcohol Talking" (Sweet, Fred Maher)
 "Vixen"
 "How Cool"
 "Having a Bad Dream"

Personnel
Matthew Sweet - guitar, bass, programming, vocals
Robert Quine - guitar
Trip Shakespeare - background vocals
Chris Stamey - guitar
Leah Kunkel - background vocals, vocal co-ordinator
Richard Lloyd - guitar
Gary Lucas - dobro, wah wah guitar
Scott Litt - engineer
Bob Ludwig - mastering
Fred Maher - programming
Ric Menck - drum samples
Kate Pierson - background vocals

References

1989 albums
Matthew Sweet albums
A&M Records albums
Albums produced by Matthew Sweet